Iride was a torpedo cruiser of the  built for the Italian Regia Marina (Royal Navy) in the 1880s. Laid down in February 1889 at the Regio Cantiere di Castellammare di Stabia shipyard, she was launched in July 1890 and was commissioned in November 1892. Her main armament were her six torpedo tubes, which were supported by a battery of ten small-caliber guns. Iride spent most of her career in the main Italian fleet, where she was primarily occupied with training exercises. During the Italo-Turkish War in September 1911, she remained in Italian waters until late in the conflict; she escorted a troop convoy to North Africa in April 1912 and bombarded Ottoman positions in June and July. Iride was eventually broken up for scrap in December 1920.

Design

The Partenope-class cruisers were derivatives of the earlier, experimental s, themselves based on the preceding cruiser . The doctrine emphasized the use of small, torpedo-armed craft to destroy expensive ironclads.

She displaced  normally. The ship had a short forecastle deck that terminated at the conning tower. She had a crew of between 96 and 121 personnel.

Her propulsion system consisted of a pair of horizontal triple-expansion steam engines, each driving a single screw propeller. Steam was supplied by four coal-fired locomotive boilers, which were vented through two widely spaced funnels.

Iride was armed with a main battery of one  /40 gun placed on the forecastle. Close-range defense against torpedo boats was provided by a secondary battery of six  /43 guns mounted singly. She was also equipped with three  /20 guns in single mounts. Her primary offensive weapon was her six  torpedo tubes.

Service history
Iride was laid down at the Regio Cantiere di Castellammare di Stabia (Royal Dockyard in Castellammare di Stabia) on 21 February 1889, and was launched on 20 July 1890. After fitting-out work was completed, the ship was commissioned into the fleet on 1 November 1892. Beginning on 14 October 1894, the Italian fleet, including Iride, assembled in Genoa for a naval review held in honor of King Umberto I at the commissioning of the new ironclad . The festivities lasted three days.

In 1895, Iride was stationed in the 2nd Maritime Department, split between Taranto and  Naples, along with most of the torpedo cruisers in the Italian fleet. In 1902, Iride was assigned as the station ship for Constantinople, responsible for safeguarding Italian interests in the Ottoman Empire.

In 1904–1905, Iride was assigned to the Levant Station in the eastern Mediterranean. She took part in the 1907 fleet maneuvers that took place in September and October that year. At the start of the Italo-Turkish War in September 1911, Iride was stationed in Italy, alternating between the ports of La Spezia and Naples, along with her sister ships Urania and Caprera. By January 1912, Iride had been stationed in Tripoli to support the garrison there against Ottoman forces. In early April, Iride, the torpedo cruiser , and six torpedo boats rendezvoused with a troop convoy carrying 10,000 men to Zuwarah near the border with Tunisia. In June and July, Iride and the armored cruiser  bombarded Turkish forces near Zuara. The Ottomans eventually agreed to surrender in October, ending the war.

Italy declared neutrality after the outbreak of World War I in August 1914, but by July 1915, the Triple Entente had convinced the Italians to enter the war against the Central Powers with promises of territory acquisition in Italia irredenta. The Austro-Hungarian Navy, which had been Italy's primary rival for decades, was the primary opponent in the conflict. The Austro-Hungarian battle fleet lay in its harbors directly across the narrow Adriatic Sea. Admiral Paolo Thaon di Revel, the Italian naval chief of staff, believed that the narrow waters and numerous islands of the Adriatic allowed Austro-Hungarian submarines and minelayers to operate with a great degree of freedom. The threat from these underwater weapons to his capital ships was too serious for him to use the fleet in an active way. Instead, Revel decided to implement blockade at the relatively safer southern end of the Adriatic with the battle fleet, while smaller vessels, such as the MAS boats, conducted raids on Austro-Hungarian ships and installations. As a result, Iride did not see action during the war. She was sold for scrap in December 1920 and was subsequently broken up for scrap.

Footnotes

Notes

Citations

References

External links
 Iride Marina Militare website

1890 ships
Partenope-class cruisers
Ships built in Castellammare di Stabia